Transducin-like enhancer protein 3 is a protein that in humans is encoded by the TLE3 gene.

References

Further reading